Esther Obeng Dapaah (born 9 May 1945) is a Ghanaian politician and a lawyer. She was the member of parliament for Abirem constituency in the 5th parliament of the 4th republic of Ghana.

Early life and education 
Esther Obeng Dapaah comes from Nkwarteng, in the Eastern Region of Ghana. She was born on 9 May 1945. She had her Bachelor of Laws from Chelmer Institute of Education in Essex, England, in 1977. She received a Bachelor of Law from Lincoln's Inn in 1978 and from the Ghana School of Law in 1979.

Employment 
Obeng Dapaah is a lawyer by profession. She has worked in the London Borough of Newham as a Rent Enforcement Officer.

Political career 
She is a member of the New Patriotic Party. She served under John Agyekum Kufuor as a Minister of Lands, Forests and Mines. She has been the Member of Parliament  for the Abirem constituency in Ghana since 2004. She was one time Chairman of the Committee for Women and Children and currently a member of the Committee for Constitutional and Legal Affairs. She was also a member of the Pan-African Parliament.

Elections 
Obeng Dapaah was elected as the Member of parliament for the 5th parliament of the 4th republic for the Abirem constituency in the 2008 Ghanaian general elections. She was elected with 13,319 votes out of the 21,962 valid votes cast, equivalent to 60.6% of the total valid votes cast.

Personal life 
Esther is a Christian and a member of the Church of Pentecost. She is single with three children.

References 

1945 births
Living people
Ghanaian Pentecostals
20th-century Ghanaian lawyers
Ghanaian MPs 2013–2017
Government ministers of Ghana
Members of Lincoln's Inn
Ghana School of Law alumni
People from Kumasi
Women government ministers of Ghana
Ghanaian women lawyers
Women members of the Parliament of Ghana
New Patriotic Party politicians
21st-century Ghanaian women politicians